Harriet Bart is a Minneapolis based conceptual artist, known for her objects, installations, and artists books.

Early life
Harriet Bart was born in 1941 in Duluth, Minnesota, and earned a degree in textiles from the University of Minnesota in 1976.

Career
Harriet Bart creates evocative content through the narrative power of objects, the theater of installation, and the intimacy of artists books. She has a deep and abiding interest in the personal and cultural expression of memory; it is at the core of her work. Using bronze and stone, wood and paper, books and words, everyday and found objects, Bart’s work signifies a site, marks an event, and draws attention to imprints of the past as they live in the present. She was the twenty-year collaborator of German artist Helmut Löhr until his death. Bart has been working collaboratively with Boston based artist Yu-Wen Wu since 2010.

Bart’s work has been exhibited extensively throughout the United States and Germany, and she has completed more than a dozen public art commissions in the United States, Japan, and Israel.  She has been the recipient of fellowships from the Bush Foundation, McKnight Foundation, MacDowell Colony, Virginia Center for Creative Arts, NEA Arts Midwest, and the Minnesota State Arts Board. Since 2000, Bart has published eleven artists books and has won three Minnesota Book Awards, most recently in 2015 for Ghost Maps. Her work is represented in notable collections, including the Jewish Museum, Metropolitan Museum of Art, New York Public Library, Library of Congress, National Gallery of Art, National Museum of Women in the Arts, Walker Art Center, Minneapolis Institute of Art, Weisman Art Museum, Yale University Art Gallery, Sackner Archive of Visual and Concrete Poetry. She is a guest lecturer, curator, and founding member 
WARM and the Traffic Zone Center for Visual Art in Minneapolis, MN.

Select exhibitions
 Weisman Art Museum, Harriet Bart: Abracadabra and Other Forms of Protection – Minneapolis (2020)
 Driscoll Babcock, New York (2016, 2013, 2011)
 Walker Art Center, Minneapolis (2015, 2010, 2009)
 Minnesota Museum of American Art, St. Paul (2015, 2013, 1995)
 Minnesota Center for Book Arts (2015, 2012, 2011, 2007, 1994)
 CAFA Art Museum, Beijing (2012)
 Law Warschaw Gallery at Macalester College, St. Paul (2012)
 New York Center for Book Arts, New York (2012, 2006)
 Weisman Art Museum, Minneapolis (2012, 2007, 2006, 1998, 1997)
 Boston Athenæum (2011)
 Minneapolis Institute of Art, Minneapolis (2011, 1989, 1984)
 King Saint Stephen Museum, Székesfehérvár (2006)
 San Francisco Center for Book Art (2006)
 Center for Contemporary Art, Santa Fe (2003)
 Klingspor Museum, Offenbach (2003)
 Museum of Art and Design, New York (2003)
 Galerie Volker Marschall, Düsseldorf (2002)
 Columbia College, Chicago (2002)
 Minneapolis College of Art and Design, Minneapolis (2000, 1988, 1982)
 The Jewish Museum, New York (1996)
 Galerie Henn, Maastrict (1995)
 Galerie Horst Dietrich, Berlin (1995)
 Ibaraki Central Library Gallery, Ibaraki City Osaka (1992)
 W.A.R.M. Gallery (1986, 1977)

Recognition
 Yaddo Residency (2018)
 McKnight Artist Fellowship (2017) 
 Minnesota Book Artist Award, Ghost Maps (2015)
 McKnight Grant for Artists Finalist (2015)
 Minnesota State Arts Board Artist Initiative Grant (2013)
 McKnight Foundation Project Grant Finalist (2013)
 Forecast McKnight Foundation Mid-Career Public Artist Professional Development Grant (2012)
 Virginia Center for the Creative Arts Residency (2010)
 Bush Foundation Artist Fellowship Finalist (2012)
 Minnesota Book Award, The Poetry of Chance Encounters (2004)
 Minnesota Book Award, Garment Register (2002)
 Partnership 2000 – A Cultural Exchange Encounter (2001)
 Bush Foundation Visual Arts Fellowship (2000)
 MCAD/McKnight Foundation Fellowship (1999)
 Jerome Foundation Sculpture Plaza Commission (1996)
 Arts Midwest/NEA Regional Visual Arts Fellowship (1993)
 Mac Dowell Colony Fellowship (1990)

Select collections
 Boston Athenæum
 Brown University
 Columbia University
 Duke University
 The Jewish Museum
 Library of Congress
 Metropolitan Museum of Art
 Minneapolis Institute of Art
 Minnesota Historical Society
 National Gallery of Art
 National Museum of Women in the Arts
 New York Public Library
 Sackner Archive of Visual and Concrete Poetry
 Smith College
 University of Minnesota
 University of Washington
 Walker Art Center
 Weisman Art Museum
 Wesleyan University
 Yale University

References

Women's Art Resources of Minnesota

External links
Official Website
Bart + Wu
Traffic Zone Center for Visual Art

1941 births
Living people
American textile artists
Artists from Minneapolis
People from Duluth, Minnesota
University of Minnesota College of Design alumni
Women textile artists